Campiña de Baena is a Mancomunidad and comarca in the province of Córdoba, Spain.  It contains the following municipalities:
 Baena
 Castro del Río
 Espejo
 Nueva Carteya
 Valenzuela

References 

Comarcas of Andalusia
Province of Córdoba (Spain)
Mancomunidad